Percy Lennard (1900–1975) was a former Australian soccer player.

Early life
Lennard was born in Inverell in 1900. As a young child, he moved to Kurri Kurri where he attended a local public school. At the age of 18, despite having shown potential in rugby league.

Club career

Rothbury
Lennard played for the Kurri Kurri under-18 team as captain in 1918 before starting his senior team at Rothbury in 1919.

Cessnock
After one year with Rothbury, Lennard joined Cessnock where he spent the rest of his career at. He helped the club to honours that included the Stevenson, Kerr and Ellis Cups, and in 1928 and 1929 the State League Premiership Cup. In his Cessnock career, he played 492 senior games and scored 210 goals for Cessnock.

International and state career
Lennard represented Australia twelve times, scoring twice. He made his Australian debut against New Zealand in 1923 where he scored Australia's first ever international goal on home soil. Lennard was inducted into the City of Cessnock Hall of Fame on 6 December 2006, he was also inducted in the Hunter Region Sporting Hall of Fame.

Lennard represented New South Wales interstate and internationally, and in 1923, was selected to play for Australia in three exhibition matches against New Zealand, and scored two goals. These matches were the first played in Australia by an international football team, and the first full A Grade international football matches played in the country. Given that he scored the first goal in the first match of the series, Lennard scored the first ever Australian international football goal on home soil. He played for Australia in nine further internationals.

Lennard's son Jack Lennard also represented Australia in international football.

Career statistics

International

Scores and results list Australia's goal tally first, score column indicates score after each Australia goal.

Death
Lennard died in Cessnock in 1975, aged 74.

References

External links
 HALL OF FAME - SPORT

Australian soccer players
1900 births
1975 deaths

Association football forwards
Australia international soccer players
Sportsmen from New South Wales
Soccer players from New South Wales